The Square du Bois or Bossquare (Dutch), also known as the Billionaire Square, is a gated community in Brussels, Belgium, next to the Avenue Louise/Louizalaan. It belongs to the owners who live there and who bear the cost of maintenance, development and repair.

See also
 List of most expensive streets by city
 Millionaires' Mile
 Bois de la Cambre

References 

Bois, square du (Avenue Louise)